Top Withens (also known as Top Withins) is a ruined farmhouse near Haworth, West Yorkshire, England, which is said to have been the inspiration for the location of the Earnshaw family house Wuthering Heights in the 1847 novel of the same name by Emily Brontë.

A plaque affixed to a wall reads:

The ruin lies on the Pennine Way east of Withins Height below Delf Hill.  It is a popular walking destination from nearby Haworth and Stanbury.  Such is the attraction to Japanese literary tourists that some footpath signs in the area include directions in Japanese.

Thunderstorm 
On 18 May 1893, Top Withens was struck by lightning during a thunderstorm. Holes were made in the wall, the roof was partially torn off, flags were cracked, and around 30 windows were almost completely removed. A portion of slate was thrown far from the house by the wind, and in the kitchen the blade of a knife had been fused by the heat. A bowl of dough prepared by the farmer's wife, Mrs. Sunderland, was smashed to pieces, and her dog and cat fled the building in fear. This was reported by the Todmorden & District News the following week.

References

External links

 The Top Withens page at "The Reader's Guide to Wuthering Heights"

Tourist attractions in the City of Bradford
Wuthering Heights
Houses in West Yorkshire